Dorothy Lewis may refer to:

 Dorothy Otnow Lewis, American psychiatrist
 Dorothy Swain Lewis (1915–2013), American aviator
 Dorothy Lewis (bowls), English lawn bowler

See also 
 Dorothy Lewis Bernstein (1914–1988), American mathematician